Stanley Allen Bastian (born April 3, 1958) is an American attorney and jurist serving as chief United States district judge of the United States District Court for the Eastern District of Washington.

Early life and education

Bastian was born in Seattle, Washington in 1958. He received a Bachelor of Science degree in 1980 from the University of Oregon and a Juris Doctor from the University of Washington School of Law in 1983.

Career 
After graduating from law school, he worked as an associate at the law firm of Bergman & Bauer from 1983 to 1984. He served as a law clerk to Judge Ward Williams of the Washington State Court of Appeals from 1984 to 1985 and as an Assistant City Attorney in Seattle, from 1985 to 1988. In 1988, he joined the law firm of Jeffers, Danielson, Sonn & Aylward, P.S. in Wenatchee, Washington, where he primarily handled civil employment cases. From 2012 to 2014, he was the managing partner of the law firm. He also served as the president of the Washington State Bar Association in 2007. Bastian was selected as a fellow of the American College of Trial Lawyers in 2007, and chaired the Equal Justice Coalition from 2010 to 2013. Over the course of his career Bastian tried hundreds of cases before juries and judges.

Federal judicial service

On September 19, 2013, President Obama nominated Bastian to serve as a United States district judge of the United States District Court for the Eastern District of Washington, to the seat vacated by Judge Edward F. Shea, who assumed senior status on June 7, 2012. The American Bar Association's committee on federal judicial recommendations unanimously rated Bastian as well-qualified for the position. On January 16, 2014 his nomination was reported out of committee. On April 11, 2014 Senate Majority Leader Harry Reid filed a motion to invoke cloture on the nomination. On April 29, 2014 a vote on the motion to invoke cloture on the nomination was agreed to by a vote of 55–41. On April 30, 2014 the nomination was confirmed by a final vote of 95–0. He received his judicial commission on May 1, 2014. He became chief judge on July 27, 2020.

On September 17, 2020, Bastian issued a nationwide preliminary injunction against the United States Postal Service to reverse changes that had occurred in early July that had slowed down mail delivery and removed sorting machines. Bastian called it a "politically-motivated attack on the efficiency of the postal service".

References

External links

1958 births
Living people
21st-century American judges
Judges of the United States District Court for the Eastern District of Washington
Lawyers from Seattle
People from Wenatchee, Washington
Public defenders
United States district court judges appointed by Barack Obama
University of Oregon alumni
University of Washington School of Law alumni
Washington (state) lawyers